So High may refer to:

 So High (EP), by Jay Sean, 2012
 "So High" (Jay Sean song), 2012
 "So High" (Doja Cat song), 2014
 "So High" (Ghost Loft song), 2013
 "So High" (Jamelia song), 1999
 "So High" (John Legend song), 2005
 "So High" (Slim Thug song), 2010
 "So High", a song by Blind Melon from For My Friends, 2008
 "So High", a song by Mist featuring Fredo, 2019
 "So High", a song by Ruben, 2019
 "So High", a song by Six60 from Six60, 2015

See also
 "I'm So Hi", a song by Three 6 Mafia from When the Smoke Clears: Sixty 6, Sixty 1, 2000
 "I'm So High", a song by Kylie Minogue from Light Years, 2000
 "She's So High", a song by Tal Bachman, 1999
 "She's So High" (Blur song), 1990